Mohammad Farrukh (born 27 December 1978) is a Pakistani first-class cricketer who played in Grade 1 for Karachi. Farrukh Started his first-class career in 1998 debuting for Karachi Blues, led by Rashid Latif. Before playing first-class cricket Farrukh was involved with the Pakistan under-19 team and was a debutant in 1996 along with Shahid Afridi, Shoaib Malik and Abdul Razzaq and toured the West Indies. In 1998 he was selected to play against England U19 and was a top performer for Karachi U19. Beside playing other distinguished domestic competitions, Farrukh traveled to England, Ireland and Australia to participate in Premier League Cricket.

References

External links
 

1978 births
Living people
Pakistani cricketers
Karachi cricketers
Karachi Port Trust cricketers
Defence Housing Authority cricketers
Cricketers from Karachi